The 2017–18 North American winter saw weather patterns across North America that were very active, erratic, and protracted, especially near the end of the season, resulting in widespread snow and cold across the continent during the winter. Significant events included rare snowfall in the South, an outbreak of frigid temperatures that affected the United States during the final week of 2017 and early weeks of January, and a series of strong nor'easters that affected the Northeastern United States during the month of March. In addition, flooding also took place during the month of February in the Central United States. Finally the winter came to a conclusion with a powerful storm system that caused a tornado outbreak and blizzard in mid-April. The most intense event, however, was an extremely powerful cyclonic blizzard that impacted the Northeastern United States in the first week of 2018. Similar to the previous winter, a La Niña was expected to influence the winter weather across North America.

While there is no well-agreed-upon date used to indicate the start of winter in the Northern Hemisphere, there are two definitions of winter which may be used. Based on the astronomical definition, winter began at the winter solstice, which in 2017 occurred on December 21, and ends at the March equinox, which in 2018 occurred on March 20. Based on the meteorological definition, the first day of winter is December 1 and the last day February 28. Each definition involves a period of approximately three months, with some variability with both definitions containing two months and a week. Winter is often defined by meteorologists to be the three calendar months with the lowest average temperatures. Since both definitions span the calendar year, it is possible to have a winter storm in two different years.

Seasonal forecasts 

On October 19, 2017, the National Oceanic and Atmospheric Administration's Climate Prediction Center released its U.S. Winter Outlook. The outlook noted a 55–65% chance that a La Niña would develop. According to CPC Deputy Director Mike Halpert, any such La Niña was expected to be "weak and potentially short-lived", but it could still affect the season. He also noted that La Niña years normally result in colder-than-average, wetter winters in the northern tier of the United States and the inverse conditions across the south. In terms of precipitation, wetter-than-average conditions were favored across the majority of the northern United States, including a region spanning from the northern Rocky Mountains to the eastern Great Lakes in addition to the Ohio Valley, Hawaii, and western and northern Alaska. Drier conditions were anticipated across the entire southern United States. Above-average temperatures were favored across the southern two-thirds of the contiguous United States and along the east coast, as well as in Hawaii and the northern and western parts of Alaska. The outlook favored below-average temperatures in the northern tier, from Minnesota to the Pacific Northwest region as well as southeastern Alaska. The remainder of the country was assigned equal chances of either above or below-normal temperatures or precipitation. The drought outlook noted that drought was likely to remain in parts of the northern Plains, with recovery likely to the west. The development of limited regions of drought was possible in regions that did not receive rainfall associated with tropical systems during the 2017 Atlantic hurricane season.

Seasonal summary 

The North American winter of 2017–18 began in the month of November with the highest snow extent in at least one and a half decades, with snow covering over a quarter of the contiguous United States, 22% more than the same date in 2011, the next-most-recent year with comparable snow coverage at that date. However, this trend did not last through all of the month, with the last week having the least snowfall of that time of year for the same time period. This extensive snowpack was due in part to cold temperatures on an extent not seen since at least 2014 in the early part of the month caused by an Arctic front advancing southward into the northern United States, breaking several record low temperatures in major cities from the Upper Midwest to the Mid-Atlantic. In early December, following another outbreak of cold temperatures, a major winter storm impacted the far southern reaches of the United States – areas as far as the southern portions of the Gulf Coast up to the Mid-Atlantic states and New England received a wide swath of accumulating snowfall, significantly hampering travel and knocking power out to tens of thousands. The rest of the month was generally warmer then average nationwide, primarily in the southwestern United States, and ranked as the third-warmest in historical records.

January and the new year opened with cold temperatures remaining in place across the eastern part of the country, which would continue until the middle of the month. In the first week of 2018, an extremely powerful cyclonic blizzard developed off the Southeastern United States, explosively deepening as it traveled parallel to the East Coast. In addition, major coastal flooding occurred with the system as well and killed at least 11 people. Another winter storm brought blizzard-like conditions and up to a foot of snow in the Upper Midwest the following week, with the Twin Cities in Minnesota receiving their largest one-day snowfall since December 2010 with  falling on January 22. The long-term pattern that brought below-average temperatures to the eastern half of the United States largely abated by the latter part of January, but not before causing drought conditions to expand within the West to its largest coverage since May 2014, due to above-average temperatures across much of the region.

The end of January saw some scattered snow-related events, but a pattern change in February brought warmer conditions to most of the U.S., and thus few wintry weather events – except for one that struck the Northeast in mid-February. By the turn of March, however, a major pattern shift occurred in which the same regions in the Northeast were hit by four consecutive rounds of nor'easters and heavy snow within a three-week period. This led places such as New York City and New Jersey to have a March that was cooler then the previous February. The first one developed on March 1, and although the most severe damage was caused by flooding as well as snow, unusually high tides and storm surges along the coast, wind and downed trees caused massive inland power outages, Days later, a second nor'easter developed and rapidly strengthened while bringing heavy snowfall to New Jersey and interior New York. The storm caused up to 1 million people to lose power. Hundreds of flights were cancelled across the region, and many schools closed due to the nor'easter. Several municipalities in the Philadelphia area declared snow emergencies and many schools and government offices were closed on March 7. Nearly a week later, a third nor'easter affected the New England coast with near-blizzard conditions and coastal flooding on March 13. Over a foot of snow was reported in portions of New Hampshire, with Deefield receiving almost 29 inches and Middleton reported 28 inches. No widespread power outages were reported. The storm brought heavy snow and blizzard conditions to Maine on March 13. Blizzard conditions were reported in Portland. Over a foot of snow was reported in portions of the state. The fourth and final nor'easter occurred on March 20 to 22, with its focus further south in the Mid-Atlantic. Some areas saw their heaviest late-season snowfall on record, and approximately 100,000 lost power as a result of the storm.

The pattern largely abated by late March, but soon made a comeback as many regions in the northern half had one of the coldest Aprils on record, and the snowpack in the U.S. was well-above average for the month of April. Wintry weather soon came to an end in the country for the season after the storm had passed.

Events

Late October bomb cyclone 

Near the end of October, a powerful extratropical cyclone formed in the Atlantic Ocean off of the coast of New England. Rapidly intensifying into a powerful nor'easter, the winter storm was enhanced by moisture left over from Tropical Storm Philippe – which dissipated over Cuba and spawned an unrelated non-tropical low that the nor'easter later absorbed – before hitting New England and eastern Canada.

The nor'easter resulted in approximately 1.2 million power outages in New England. The system produced tropical storm-force sustained winds, reaching 57 mph (92 km/h) in Warwick, Rhode Island, and hurricane-force wind gusts, peaking at 93 mph (150 km/h) in Popponesset, Massachusetts. The system also produced snowfall mainly in the higher elevations, in areas such as West Virginia and some parts of western Maryland.

Mid-November cold wave 
After an exceptionally warm September and October for many places in the Midwestern and Northeastern United States, a strong Arctic airmass entered the Midwest on November 9, resulting in some of the coldest temperatures ever recorded this early in the season. Lake-effect snow fell in places like the Upper Peninsula of Michigan, where the Mackinac Bridge had to be closed due to low visibility. Chicago on November 10 also reported Lake-effect snow. The timeframe of November 10–11 broke record lows from northern Minnesota to the New York City tri-state area. On November 10, record lows were recorded in the Midwest. Among these November 10 records were five locations in the Upper Midwest that plunged below zero. In addition to the International Falls, Minnesota, the coldest, and even earliest, record lows mentioned above were set in Hibbing, Minnesota , Duluth, Minnesota and Pellston, Michigan , and Merrill, Wisconsin . The Arctic intrusion on November 10 came as a shock to people that had yet to seen temperatures cold enough for frost, especially in New England. Before then, not only it was one of the warmest Fall seasons to that date, places like Philadelphia and Washington D.C. had yet to see a day/night that was below  since the previous Spring earlier that year. This came 2°F (1°C) within reaching the record set for that day in 1961. Washington D.C. tied their record of  that same morning set back in 1973. Many cities in the Great Lakes and Northeast set record lows that morning, which record lows were recorded as far south as Charlotte, North Carolina. Forecasters even called for an earlier start to winter ahead of this cold wave, and a colder winter then the last 2 years.

Early December winter storm 

A strong winter storm affected areas from northeastern Mexico to the Northeastern United States in early December. The origins of the storm were complex, with the initial disturbance forming over the extreme southern United States as a stationary front left behind from a departing extratropical cyclone on December 7. At the same time, a cold air mass was establishing itself into the Deep South. A large plume of moisture encompassed the entire Gulf Coast, and snow broke out early on December 8 in places that rarely even see snow, including Mexico, southeastern Texas and Louisiana – even in the Florida Panhandle. Transitioning into a nor'easter off the East Coast of the United States, the system began moving parallel to the shoreline, with a large swath of snowfall accompanying it. The low slowly deepened throughout the day of December 9, bringing the first snow of the season to many parts of the Northeast and New England.

Up to 400,000 people were left without power across the affected regions, several schools and roads shut down, and 3 were have confirmed to have been killed by the storm as of December 9. One person died in Georgia, and two in Virginia. The highest amount, was in Mount Mitchell, North Carolina. Alabama had numerous car crashes along Interstate 65. Atlanta saw over 1,000 cancellations. Snow fell as south as the Florida Panhandle and Brownsville, Texas, the latter was recently just shy of  three days earlier.

Post-Christmas–mid-January cold wave 

In late December, a strong Arctic air mass, due to the weakening of the Northern Polar vortex, came and established from Canada into the Midwestern and Northeastern United States with the core of the cold centered in the Upper Midwest, Interior Northeast, and Eastern Canada. In 2017, Watertown, New York and Buffalo, New York each had it coldest final week on record for the year.

Other daily record low temperatures included Cedar Rapids, Iowa , Pierre, South Dakota , South Bend, Indiana , Quincy, Illinois  and Lynchburg, Virginia .

In their first few days of 2018, the cold front was stretched as far south into the Caribbean. However, temperatures were much warmer - Havana didn’t see any temperatures below .

Early January blizzard 

A severe blizzard caused disruption along the Eastern United States in the first few days of the new year. The storm started on January 3, 2018, moving rapidly to the northeast, after which time the system moved east, causing great snowfall. The storm was also dubbed as a "historic bomb cyclone".

The blizzard produced snowfall and other forms of frozen precipitation across much of the United States Eastern Seaboard. At least twenty-two fatalities were attributed to the storm, including at least eight car accident-related deaths. At least 4,020 flights were cancelled across the United States, with a majority of cancellations caused by the extensive winter storm. Insurers estimate that claims relating to coastal flooding from the storm will be more than those from snow-related damage.

Mid-January winter storms 
In mid-January, two winter storms caused widespread disruption across the eastern half of the United States. The first one spread a swath of snow and ice across the northern parts of the Ohio Valley and New England, as a strong cold front pushed through the regions with a developing low.

The second one, although much less widespread than the first one, crossed Southern, Midwestern, and Northeastern United States and brought snow to places that rarely see it. This storm hit Texas and the Midwest on January 16, 2018. Then, the storm impacted New England and Mid-Atlantic states on January 17. Up to  fell in Shreveport, Louisiana, marking the first time more than an inch of snow fell in Shreveport since 2015. Austin, Houston, and San Antonio, Texas saw many vehicle accidents because of sleet and freezing rain on the morning of January 16. This led to an overwhelming number of vehicular accidents, such as several accidents in the Dallas-Fort Worth metroplex near Canton. In Galveston, hundreds of pipes froze and burst, depleting the city's water reserves to drought levels and forcing Galveston County and Chambers County to implement mandatory water conservation measures until the pipes could be fixed. Florida observed snow for the third time during the winter, with snow and freezing rain observed in portions of the Florida Panhandle. Snow fell in Crestview and DeFuniak Springs while freezing rain fell in Fort Walton Beach. Pensacola saw sleet which accumulated on grass and vehicles. The Bob Sikes Bridge to Pensacola Beach was closed due to ice. Snow fell on portions of the East Coast and Northeast. East Machias, Maine got , Stockbridge, Massachusetts got , Rosendale, New York got , Loyseville, Pennsylvania got , Dover, New Hampshire got , Canaan, Connecticut got , and Wantage, New Jersey got . Ten people were killed due to the storm, and numerous roads were shut down as well.

Mid-February Mid-Atlantic winter storm 

The system intensified once offshore, but its impacts caused widespread disruption and slippery roads across metro areas in the overnight hours. Ice accumulations also occurred and served to sag some trees in Virginia.

Early–late March nor'easters 
After a period of record warmth in late February, weather patterns across the continent abruptly became much more active in March.  Four powerful nor'easters affected the United States and eastern Canada in that month alone, each dropping more than a foot of snow in the areas affected. Much of the Delaware Water Gap National Recreation Area closed due to the nor'easters.

March 1–3 nor'easter

The first nor'easter began to take shape over the Mid-Atlantic states at the transition of February and March.  As an area of low pressure moved into the interior Northeast late on March 1, snowfall fell in areas close to the Canada–United States border, while precipitation in coastal areas was rain due to slightly warmer air. Overnight into the early morning hours of March 2, a new area of low pressure formed and rapidly strengthened off the coast of New Jersey, while snow began to slowly increase in coverage near Pennsylvania and southern New York. Wet bulbing helped bring snow to areas closer on the coast, such as New York City.

Although the most severe damage was caused by flooding as well as snow, unusually high tides and storm surges along the coast, wind and downed trees caused massive inland power outages, with the number of outages as high as 1.6 million at one point. As of March 2, at least 9 people are known to have been killed as a result of the storm, five from falling trees or branches.

March 6–8 nor'easter

As the first nor'easter occurred, a smaller, but significant blizzard struck the Sierra Nevada mountains and then tracked across the continent as a large weather front, dropping snow across the Midwestern United States and interior Canada. As it reached the Great Lakes on March 6, another low pressure area formed off the Outer Banks of North Carolina. The storm caused up to 1 million people to lose power, and at least 1 person has been confirmed dead due to the storm as of March 7.

Hundreds of flights were cancelled across the region, and many schools closed due to the nor'easter, although some opted to remain open. Many freeways were also closed in the regions, and several states were put under state of emergencies. In Pennsylvania, Governor Tom Wolf declared a state of emergency for several counties in the eastern part of the state. A snow emergency went into effect for the city of Philadelphia on the morning of March 7. Several municipalities in the Philadelphia area declared snow emergencies and many schools and government offices were closed on March 7. Many attractions in the Philadelphia area either closed early or were closed for the entire day on March 7.  The nor'easter had moved off by the morning of March 9, but its remnants stalled over Maritime Canada and persisted throughout the weekend.

March 12–14 nor'easter

On the night of March 11, several areas of low pressure developed over the American Southeast and merged into a third nor'easter within 24 hours. On March 13, the storm produced blizzard conditions and a swath of 1–3 feet of snow in New England as it moved northeast into the Gulf of Maine. The storm brought heavy snow blizzard conditions to Rhode Island on March 13. Blizzard conditions were reported in Newport. The storm brought the heaviest March snow on record in Boston and Worcester. The storm brought heavy snow and blizzard conditions to Massachusetts on March 13. Blizzard conditions were reported in several locations including Boston, Hyannis, Falmouth, Plymouth, Marshfield, and Martha's Vineyard.

Over a foot of snow was reported in portions of New Hampshire, with Deefield receiving almost 29 inches and Middleton reported 28 inches. No widespread power outages were reported. The storm brought heavy snow and blizzard conditions to Maine on March 13. Blizzard conditions were reported in Portland. Over a foot of snow was reported in portions of the state.

March 20–22 nor'easter

Having been affected by three previous nor'easters in the month of March, the impending storm caused intense preparation across the region. In the early morning hours of March 20, several hundred flights were either canceled or rerouted ahead of the storm. More than 4,000 flights were canceled on March 21, mainly because of the nor'easter. Amtrak modified or canceled service on several trains running along the Northeast Corridor on March 21 and 22 due to the nor'easter. Over 100,000 people lost power from the nor'easter.

April cold wave

A period of colder-then-average temperatures impacted a large swath of the United States east of the Rocky Mountains from late March to the middle of April, resulting in one of the coldest Aprils for many areas in years, especially the Upper Midwest. This occurred as a result of a persistent pattern throughout much of April favoring high pressure within the Western United States, and troughs within the eastern half of the country, allowing cold air to funnel down. This pattern ended by May, and resulted in one of the most dramatic swings between months in the United States.

In the states of Iowa and Wisconsin, the month was the coldest April ever experienced within the states' 124-year record, surpassing April 1907 by 1.5 °F (0.9 °C). Many states experienced one of their top-ten coldest Aprils on record, with 8 other states seeing their 2nd coldest April, and the continental United States’s mean April temperature of  made it the 13th coldest April on record and the coldest since 1997. The snow cover for most of April was the fifth-largest on record for the U.S. On April 2, 2018, the cold wave allows  of snow to fall in New York City, with heavier snow in the suburbs. Snow fell at up to two inches per hour. This was their heaviest April snow in 36 years. This forced the New York Yankees to cancel their home opener. This became the second biggest April snowstorm in Newark, New Jersey. April 2018 became the second snowiest April on record in Bridgeport, Connecticut and the eighth snowiest on record in Central Park as a result. The cold snap also caused the postponement of 28 Major League Baseball games, including the aforementioned Yankees home opener. This set a record for the most baseball games postponed in a single month.

Mid-April blizzard 

In mid-April, a powerful weather system created heavy snow and blizzard conditions over much of the upper Midwest, as well as severe weather in the South. Green Bay, Wisconsin reported , its second-heaviest snowstorm of all time and largest ever for the month of April. Further east, a severe ice storm took place. In Ontario, a mix of snow, freezing rain, ice pellets and rain battered Toronto and the surrounding area, causing hundreds of vehicle collisions, flight cancellations, power outages and transportation delays. Freezing rain also caused problems in Ottawa, Montreal, and parts of New Brunswick.

Records

United States
Other daily record low temperatures included Cedar Rapids, Iowa , Pierre, South Dakota , South Bend, Indiana , Quincy, Illinois  and Lynchburg, Virginia . On January 6, Raleigh–Durham International Airport in North Carolina set a record for the longest time spent below , 159 hours according to WTVD. The record of eight days set in 1895 and 1917 still had yet to be broken, but temperatures were not recorded every hour at that time. On January 7, temperatures in Massachusetts were so cold that part of Buzzards Bay froze.

On February 21, 2018, record warm temperatures affected the eastern part of the United States. February 20 also saw record high February temperatures in Pittsburgh, Indianapolis, Charlestown, WV, and Cincinnati. This was due to a record breaking ridge. Washington DC hit , the warmest so early in the season. Eight states had record warm February’s in the United States, them being Alabama, Florida, Georgia, North Carolina, South Carolina, Connecticut, Rhode Island and Massachusetts. In addition, flooding on the Ohio River made this a record wet February across Arkansas, Tennessee, Missouri, Illinois, Indiana, and Pennsylvania.

Canada
Some Canadian cities had some of their coldest New Years on record, affecting plans in towns such as Calgary (which forecast a high of ), Ottawa (overnight low of ), and Toronto (after wind chill), although the CBC reported that Montreal and Winnipeg decided to go on without any changes.

Season effects
This is a table of all of the events that have occurred in the 2017–18 North American winter. It includes their duration, damage, impacted locations, and death totals. Deaths in parentheses are additional and indirect (an example of an indirect death would be a traffic accident), but were still related to that storm. All of the damage figures are in 2018 USD.

See also 
 2017–18 European windstorm season

Notes

References

External links 
 2017 Storm Summaries and 2018 Storm Summaries from the Weather Prediction Center

2017 meteorology
2018 meteorology

North American winters
Winter
Winter